"Wenn alle untreu werden, so bleiben wir doch treu" (If all become unfaithful, we remain loyal) is the opening line of a famous patriotic German popular song written by Max von Schenkendorf in 1814. Schenkendorf dedicated the song to Friedrich Ludwig Jahn for the Holy Roman Empire.

The melody was a slightly modified form of "", a French hunting song dating from 1724.

The title also refers to a German hymn of the same name, written by the German poet Novalis in 1799. The first two lines of this hymn are the same as in Schenkendorf's song.

Gerhard Roßbach included the song in the activities of his German Youth Movement in which "its emphasis on loyalty in adversity and faith in Germany precisely fit Roßbach's desire to unify conservative forces behind a project of political and cultural renewal." During the Third Reich the song was used extensively by the Nazi SS, and became known as Treuelied (song of faithfulness).

Lyrics

Melody

References

External links
 

Political party songs
German songs
Nazi SS
1814 songs
German patriotic songs